Mark of Toledo (fl. 1193-1216) was a Spanish physician and a canon of Toledo.

Biography
He produced one of the earliest translations of the Qur'an into Latin while working at the Toledo School of Translators. He also translated Hippocrates' De aere aquis et locis,  Hunayn Ibn Ishaq's versions of four of Galen's treatises.

See also
Toledo School of Translators
Translations into Latin (c. 1050-c.1250)

External sources
http://faculty.washington.edu/petersen/alfonso/esctra12.htm

Arabic–Latin translators
Medieval Spanish physicians
People from Toledo, Spain
Translators of the Quran into Latin
12th-century births
13th-century deaths
13th-century translators
13th-century physicians